WDAE (620 AM) is a commercial radio station licensed to St. Petersburg, Florida and serving the Tampa Bay area.  It is owned by iHeartMedia and airs a sports radio format.  WDAE is one of the oldest radio stations in Florida still broadcasting today, going on the air in 1922.  The studios and offices are on West Gandy Boulevard in South Tampa.  The transmitter site is located near the Gandy Bridge in St. Petersburg.

WDAE is licensed to broadcast with 5,600 watts by day and 5,500 watts at night.  AM 620 is a regional broadcast frequency; because AM 620 is subject to interference from high-powered Cuban stations, the Federal Communications Commission (FCC) has given WDAE special temporary authority (STA) for higher power: 11,280 watts daytime and 11,000 watts nighttime.  It uses a directional antenna at night.  WDAE broadcasts using the iBiquity HD radio system during daytime hours.  Programming is also heard on FM translator W237CW at 95.3 MHz and on the HD-3 digital subchannel of co-owned WBTP (95.7 FM).

Programming
Three local shows are heard on weekdays on WDAE: Ronnie Lane and Tom Krasniqi – "The Ronnie and Tkras Show" in late mornings, Pat Donovan and Aaron Jacobson with "The Pat and Aaron Show" in early afternoons, and Ron Diaz and Ian Beckles with "The Ron and Ian Show" during late afternoons.  In mornings, nights and weekends, WDAE airs syndicated programming from ESPN Radio.  Some programming from Fox Sports Radio is also heard on the station.

FM Translator
Programming is simulcast on FM translator W237CW.

History

WDAE AM 1250 history
On December 1, 1921, the U.S. Department of Commerce, which regulated radio at this time, adopted the first regulations formally establishing a broadcasting station category, which set aside the wavelength of 360 meters (833 kHz) for entertainment broadcasts, and 485 meters (619 kHz) for market and weather reports.

On May 15, 1922, the Tampa Times, an afternoon daily newspaper, was issued a license for operation on both the 365 and 485 meter wavelengths. The call sign, WDAE, was randomly assigned from a sequential roster of available call letters. WDAE was the second Florida broadcasting station licensed under the new regulations, following WCAN in Jacksonville, which was authorized seven days earlier, and, after a series of test transmissions, made its formal debut on May 17. WCAN was deleted on October 26, 1922. (Some sources have listed WQAM in Miami as Florida's oldest station, with varying claims of a history dating back to as early as 1920, however FCC records report WQAM's "Date First Licensed" as January 23, 1923.)

WDAE, as most early radio stations, broadcast on several frequencies during its beginning years, settling on AM 1250 by 1941.  In 1947, still owned by the newspaper, it added an FM station, 105.7 WDAE-FM (now WMTX 100.7 FM).

Through the 1940s and 50s, WDAE-AM-FM were CBS Radio Network affiliates, carrying its dramas, comedies, news, sports, soap operas, game shows and big band remotes during the Golden Age of Radio.  In the late 1960s, WDAE-FM switched to beautiful music, while the AM station was a popular Top 40 station.

WDAE aired the popular talk show "Desperate & Dateless" on Friday nights with host Rosemary Haddad and producer Sam Cardinale.  In the 1980s, as Top 40 listening switched to FM, WDAE changed to an oldies format.  By the 1990s, it had moved to adult standards and later began simulcasting the adult contemporary music format of co-owned WUSA (100.7 FM, now WMTX) in November 1990.

In March 1994, WDAE switched to classic country as "Country Gold Froggy 1250" with former WUSA personalities whose on-air names became I.B. Green, Jimmy Hoppa and Davey Croakett.

In 1999, the station was acquired by Clear Channel Communications, the previous name of current owner iHeartMedia.  Clear Channel switched WDAE to its current all-sports format as "The Sports Animal."

WSUN AM 620 history

On November 1, 1927, WSUN first signed on the air.  For most of its early history, it was owned by the City of St. Petersburg.  WSUN used the first directional AM antenna system in the U.S., implemented in order to protect WTMJ in Milwaukee, Wisconsin, also on 620 kHz.  In its early years, WSUN was an ABC Radio affiliate, carrying the network's schedule until the 1960s, when it moved to a full service middle of the road music format.

Through the 1970s and 80s, WSUN aired country music.  It was owned by Plough Broadcasting, a subsidiary of the pharmaceutical firm Schering-Plough.  In 1988, Cox Broadcasting acquired WSUN and switched it to talk and later to 1950s-based adult standards.  In 1998, pending a sale, WSUN began simulcasting the audio from Time Warner (then Bright House Networks, now Spectrum) local cable TV news station "Bay News 9," changing the call letters of AM 620 to WSAA.  Cox Broadcasting moved the WSUN call letters and its standards format over to its co-owned station on AM 910 in nearby Plant City, Florida (now WTWD).

WDAE moves to 620
On January 1, 2000, three Tampa Bay radio stations, including WDAE, were involved in a frequency swap.  WSUN had previously vacated AM 620, moving to AM 910.  WDAE and its sports format moved from 1250 to 620.  Business-formatted WHNZ, which Clear Channel had bought from Paxson Communications in 1998, switched from AM 570 to WDAE's previous home at 1250. In addition, Clear Channel put a news/talk format on AM 570, changing the call letters to WTBN, which stood for Tampa Bay News.  Salem Communications bought WTBN the following year, installing a Christian radio format.

In late 2012, WDAE became the Tampa Bay home of ESPN Radio, as rival sports station WHBO (1040 AM) switched affiliation to the new NBC Sports Radio Network.

On November 28, 2018, WDAE rebranded as "95.3 WDAE", utilizing the FM translator in its branding.

Sports team associations
WDAE is the flagship station for the Tampa Bay Rays baseball team. It is also the Tampa Bay home of South Florida Bulls football and Florida Gators men's basketball games. Each year, WDAE carries the Firestone Grand Prix of St. Petersburg auto race.

The station had been the flagship station for the Tampa Bay Buccaneers football.  Beginning with the 2017 season, the team's broadcasts move to co-owned active rock station 97.9 FM WXTB.  WDAE continues to air interviews with players and coaches during game weeks.

WDAE had also been the flagship radio station for the Tampa Bay Lightning of the National Hockey League (which is now on sister station WFLA).  WDAE had also broadcast the Tampa Bay Storm of the Arena Football League (later heard on sister station WHNZ).

Previous logo
 (WDAE's logo using the primary 620 AM frequency branding)

References

External links
FCC History Cards for WDAE (covering 1937-1979 as WSUN on 620 kHz, beginning with split of WFLA-WSUN into two separate stations)
WDAE Website

Article about Chris Thomas - St. Pete Times, February 20, 2004

DAE
Sports radio stations in the United States
Radio stations established in 1922
1922 establishments in Florida
IHeartMedia radio stations